The 2022 Gulf South Conference football season was the season of college football played by the eight member schools of the Gulf South Conference (GSC) as part of the 2022 NCAA Division II football season.

West Florida and Delta State were GSC co-champions for the 2022 season. They were ranked No. 4 and No. 9, respectively, in the final 2022 NCAA Division II football rankings issued by the American Football Coaches Association (AFCA). A third conference member, West Georgia, placed at No. 19 in the final AFCA rankings.

Quarterback Patrick Shegog of Delta State was selected as the GSC Offensive Player of the Year. Linebacker Michael Anderson of West Alabama was named Defensive Player of the Year. Todd Cooley of Delta State won the GSC Coach of the Year award.

Conference overview

Conference awards

Individual awards
 Offensive Player of the Year - Patrick Shegog, Delta State
 Defensive Player of the Year - Michael Anderson, West Alabama
 Offensive Freshman of the Year - John Henry White, Mississippi College
 Defensive Freshman of the Year - Kendrick Clark, North Greenville
 Coach of the Year - Todd Cooley, Delta State

All-conference team
First-team offense
 Quarterback - Patrick Shegog, Delta State
 Running backs - Shomari Mason, West Florida; Jaxton Carson, West Georgia
 AP - Seth McGill, Valdosta State; Bry Webb, West Alabama
 Tight end - Kyle Morlock, Shorter
 Wide receivers - David Durden, West Florida; Dohnte Meyers, Delta State; Caden Leggett, West Florida; Victor Talley, Valdosta State
 Center - Zac Elam, West Florida
 Offensive guards -  Dalton Simpler, West Florida; Keshawn Jennings, Delta State
 Offensive tackles - Jacob Bruce, West Florida; Nicolas Melsop, Delta State

First-team defense
 Defensive line - Davonch Bryant, West Alabama; Pooda Walker, West Florida Timaje Porter, Delta State; Marzavion Dix, West Georgia
 Linebackers - Michael Anderson, West Alabama; Donald De’Iveon, North Greenville;; Willie Jordan, West Florida; Tamos Stevenson, Delta State
 Defensive backs - Shamar Lewis, West Alabama; Robert Carter, West Georgia; Deontae Overstreet, West Georgia#; Malik Jones, Delta State

First-team special teams
 Kicker - Nick Herber, Delta State
 Punter - Myles Prosser, North Greenville
 Return specialist - David Durden, West Florida
 UT - Da’Quan Bailey-Brown, West Florida; Cody Myers, Mississippi College

Teams

West Florida

The 2022 West Florida Argonauts football team represented the University of West Florida of Pensacola, Florida. In their seventh year under head coach Pete Shinnick, the Argonauts compiled a 12–2 record (6–1 against conference opponents), tied for the GSC championship, and were ranked No. 4 in the final of the AFCA poll. They advanced to the NCAA Division II playoffs, losing to Ferris State in a semifinal game.  

West Florida played its home games at Pen Air Field in Pensacola. Before the 2022 season, the Argonauts played their home games at Admiral Fetterman Field.

Schedule

Rankings

Delta State

The 2022 Delta State Statesmen football team represented Delta State University of Cleveland, Mississippi. In their tenth year under head coach Todd Cooley, the Statesmen compiled an 11–2 record (6–1 against conference opponents), tied for the GSC championship, and were ranked No. 9 in the final AFCA poll. they advanced to the NCAA Division II playoffs, losing to West Florida in the second round. They played their home games at Parker Field at Horace McCool Stadium.

Schedule

Rankings

West Georgia

The 2022 West Georgia Wolves football team represented the University of West Georgia of Carrollton, Georgia. In their sixth year under head coach David Dean, the Wolves compiled an 8–2 record (5–2 against conference opponents), finished third in the GSC, and were ranked No. 19 in the final AFCA poll. They played their home games at University Stadium.

Schedule

Rankings

West Alabama

The 2022 West Alabama Tigers football team represented the University of West Alabama of Livingston, Alabama. In their ninth year under head coach Brett Gilliland, the Tigers compiled a 5–6 record (3–4  against conference opponents) and finished fourth in the conference. The Tigers played all their home games at Tiger Stadium.

Schedule

1 The October 29 game was originally scheduled for 4.00 p.m. but moved because of risk of inclement weather.

Mississippi College

The 2022 Mississippi College Choctaws football team represented Mississippi College of Clinton, Mississippi. In their ninth year uner head coach John Bland, the Choctaws compiled a 4–7 record (3–4 against  conference opponents) and finished fifth in the conference. They played their home games at Robinson-Hale Stadium.

Schedule

Valdosta State

The 2022 Valdosta State Blazers football team represented Valdosta State University of Valdosta, Georgia. In their first year under head coach Tremaine Jackson, the Blazers compiled a 5–6 record (2–5 against conference opponents) and finished sixth in the GSC. They played their home games at Bazemore–Hyder Stadium.

Schedule

Rankings

North Greenville

The 2022 North Greenville Crusaders football team represented North Greenville University of Tigerville, South Carolina. In their tenth year under head coach Jeff Farrington, the Crusaders compiled a 3–8 record (2–5 against conference opponents) and finished seventh in the conference. They played their home games at Younts Stadium.

Schedule

Shorter

The 2022 Shorter Hawks football team represented Shorter University of Rome Georgia. In their fifth year head coach Zach Morrison, the Hawks compiled a 3–8 record (1–6 against conference opponents) and finished eighth in the conference. They played their home games at Barron Stadium.

Schedule

References